Thailand made its Paralympic Games début at the 1984 Summer Paralympics in Stoke Mandeville and New York City, with competitors in athletics, lawn bowls and swimming. The country has participated in every subsequent edition of the Summer Paralympics, but has never taken part in the Winter Games.

Medals

Medals by Summer Games

Medals by Winter Games

Medals by Summer Sport

Medals by Winter Sport

List of medalists

Medals by individual
According to official data of the International Paralympic Committee. This is a list of people who have won two or more Paralympic medals for Thailand. 

People in bold are still active competitors

Flag bearers

Flag bearers by Summer Games

Flag bearers by Winter Games

See also

 Olympics
 Thailand at the Olympics
 Thailand at the Youth Olympics
 Asian Games
 Thailand at the Asian Games
 Thailand at the Asian Para Games

 Other
 Thailand at the Universiade
 Thailand at the World Games

References